Jessie Prichard Hunter is an American novelist. She is the author of three psychological thrillers, Blood Music, One Two Buckle My Shoe., and The Green Muse: An Edouard Mas Novel.

She currently resides in New York's Hudson Valley with her husband and two children.

References

20th-century American novelists
Living people
American women novelists
20th-century American women writers
Year of birth missing (living people)
21st-century American women